Renate-Ly Mehevets (born 2 March 1999) is an Estonian international footballer who plays as right back or winger for Belgian club Sporting Charleroi and the Estonia women's national team.

Career
In 2011, Renate-Ly started playing with the youth team of FC Lootos in Põlva. 

In 2016, she signed to Tammeka to play in Naiste Meistriliiga, the highest league of women's association football in Estonia.

She made her debut for the Estonian national team on 3 April 2019 against Azerbaijan, coming on as a substitute for Liisa Merisalu.

In summer 2020, Renate-Ly signed a contract for one season with the Belgian team Charleroi and became the first Estonian player in the Belgian women's Super League.

References

1999 births
Living people
Women's association football forwards
Estonian women's footballers
Estonia women's international footballers
People from Põlva
Estonian expatriate footballers
Expatriate women's footballers in Belgium
Estonian expatriate sportspeople in Belgium